Staroakkulayevo (İśke Aqqolay) is a rural locality (a village) in Kazansky Selsoviet, Alsheyevsky District, Bashkortostan, Russia. The population was 232 as of 2010. There are 3 streets.

Geography 
Staroakkulayevo is located 8 km north of Rayevsky (the district's administrative centre) by road. Novoakkulayevo is the nearest rural locality.

References 

Rural localities in Alsheyevsky District